Journal of Cardiovascular Pharmacology and Therapeutics is a quarterly peer-reviewed medical journal that covers cardiology. The editor-in-chief is Karin Przyklenk (Wayne State University) and the founding editor is Bramah N. Singh (University of California, Los Angeles). It was established in 1996 and is published by SAGE Publications.

Abstracting and indexing 
The journal is abstracted and indexed in Scopus and the Science Citation Index Expanded. According to the Journal Citation Reports, its 2014 impact factor is 2.094, ranking it 142 out of 254 journals in the category "Pharmacology & Pharmacy" and 62 out of 123 journals in the category "Cardiac and Cardiovascular Systems".

References

External links 
 

SAGE Publishing academic journals
English-language journals
Cardiology journals
Quarterly journals
Publications established in 1996
Pharmacology journals